The Beloved Vagabond is a 1915 romantic drama film directed by Edward José and starring Edwin Arden. Originally, prints of the film were hand-colored. Darius Milhaud wrote the music to be played with this silent film.

The film is based on the 1906 novel The Beloved Vagabond by William John Locke. Two other film versions were made The Beloved Vagabond in 1923 and The Beloved Vagabond in 1936.

Plot
The wealthy Gaston de Nerac (Arden) decides to live as a tramp until he falls in love.

Cast
 Edwin Arden - Gaston de Nerac / Paragot 
 Kathryn Brown-Decker - Joanna Rushworth
 Bliss Milford - Blanquette
 Doc Crane - Asticot
 Mathilde Brundage
 Florence Deshon

References

External links

The Beloved Vagabond at SilentEra

1915 films
1910s English-language films
1915 romantic drama films
American silent feature films
American romantic drama films
Films scored by Darius Milhaud
American black-and-white films
Films based on British novels
Pathé Exchange films
Films directed by Edward José
1910s American films
Silent romantic drama films
Silent American drama films